The Baraque de Fraiture is the highest point in the province of Luxembourg, Wallonia, Belgium. It has a ski area comprising 3 pistes (350, 700 and 1,000 metres long), which normally open for less than 20 days a year. However, it has been open for up to 60 days per year recently.

Geography 

La Baraque de Fraiture is on the ridge separating the Basin of  the River Ourthe from that of the Amblève on the summit of the Plateau des Tailles consisting of grassland, countryside and forest.

Access 
The Baraque de Fraiture may be reached via the autoroute du Soleil (A26 / E25), exiting at junction 50 and turning onto the N30 (Liège–Bastogne) and N89 (La Roche-en-Ardenne–Salmchâteau).

History 
During the Second World War, on 11 May 1940, the day after the outbreak of the Battle of Belgium, the Baraque de Fraiture was taken by Germans of the 5th Panzer Division with the objective of crossing the River Meuse at Dinant.

In popular culture 
In December 2005, Dutch playwright, Ivan Vrambout, put on a play entitled Baraque Frituur which featured the mutual prejudices of Flemish and Walloons. The title of the piece was inspired by the way in which this author, like many Belgian children, used the words Baraque Fraiture when he was a child when referring to a baraque à frites, saying baraque friture (a friterie or chip kiosk) instead of fraiture (frituur has the same meaning in Dutch and French in this case). These friteries were usually mobile kiosks where traditional Belgian chips were sold in Belgium.

References

External links 

 Official website

Mountains under 1000 metres
Mountains and hills of the Ardennes (Belgium)
Ski areas and resorts in Belgium
Landforms of Luxembourg (Belgium)
Vielsalm